Carl Henry Fennema (October 17, 1926 – September 2022) was an American football center who played for the New York Giants. He played college football at the University of Washington, having previously attended Woodrow Wilson High School in Long Beach, California. He is a member of the Long Beach Century Club Hall of Fame. Fennema died in September 2022 at the age of 95.

References

1926 births
2022 deaths
American football centers
Washington Huskies football players
New York Giants players
Players of American football from San Francisco